Cyperus stramineoferrugineus is a species of sedge that is endemic to Tanzania.

The species was first formally described by the botanist Georg Kükenthal in 1936.

See also
 List of Cyperus species

References

stramineoferrugineus
Taxa named by Georg Kükenthal
Plants described in 1936
Flora of Tanzania